Camila Osorio won the girls' singles tennis title at the 2019 US Open, defeating Alexandra Yepifanova 6−1, 6−0 in the final.

Wang Xiyu was the defending champion, but she competed in the women's singles as a lucky loser losing to Kirsten Flipkens in the first round.

Seeds

Main draw

Finals

Top half

Section 1

Section 2

Bottom half

Section 3

Section 4

Qualifying

Seeds

Qualifiers

Lucky loser
  Romana Čisovská

Draw

First qualifier

Second qualifier

Third qualifier

Fourth qualifier

Fifth qualifier

Sixth qualifier

Seventh qualifier

Eighth qualifier

External links 
 Draw

Girls' Singles
US Open, 2019 Girls' Singles